Imperialism is a policy or ideology of extending the authority of a country over other countries and people.

Imperialism may also refer to:

Imperialism, the Highest Stage of Capitalism, a 1917 book by Lenin
Imperialism (Hobson book), a 1902 book by John A. Hobson
Imperialism (speech), a 1900 speech by William Jennings Bryan
Imperialism (video game), a 1997 turn-based strategy game
Theory of imperialism, a largely Marxist theory concerning the transfer of profit between countries